Timothy Godfrey is a former Australian rules footballer, who played for the Fitzroy Football Club in the Victorian Football League (VFL).

References

External links

1957 births
Living people
Fitzroy Football Club players
Cobden Football Club players
Australian rules footballers from Victoria (Australia)